Gianni Rossi (born 14 October 1936 in Venice) is a retired Italian professional football player.

1936 births
Living people
Italian footballers
Serie A players
Venezia F.C. players
Juventus F.C. players
S.S.C. Bari players
Association football midfielders